Amba (also spelled Bulebule, Hamba, Humu, Kihumu, Ku-Amba, Kuamba, Lubulebule, Lwamba, Ruwenzori Kibira, and Rwamba) is a language spoken in parts of Uganda and the Democratic Republic of Congo by the Amba people. The Amba people call it Kwamba and it is known as Kihumu  in the Democratic Republic of the Congo. Amba has a 70% lexical similarity with Bera. Dialects include Kyanzi (Kihyanzi) and Suwa (Kusuwa).

There was once an Amba pidgin called Vamba, now extinct.

References

External links
 Resources in and about the Amba language

Languages of the Democratic Republic of the Congo
Languages of Uganda
Biran languages